Yıldırım Akbulut (2 September 1935 – 14 April 2021) was a Turkish politician, who was a leader of the Motherland Party (ANAP), the Prime Minister of Turkey, and twice the Speaker of the Grand National Assembly of Turkey.

A lawyer by profession, Akbulut was one of the founding members of the Motherland Party in 1983. Entering Parliament in the 1983 general election, he became the Minister of the Interior under Prime Minister and ANAP leader Turgut Özal in 1984. Serving until 1987, Akbulut was then fielded as his party's candidate for Parliamentary speaker, which he won and subsequently served until 1989.

In 1989, Özal contested the presidential election and was elected the 8th President of Turkey. Özal chose Akbulut as his successor as Prime Minister, leading him to be elected ANAP leader and taking office as the 20th Prime Minister of Turkey. He was widely regarded as a 'puppet' of President Özal, who was accused despite his ceremonial and impartial position of calling the shots for the government. He was defeated in the 1991 ANAP leadership primaries by Mesut Yılmaz and subsequently left office. In 1999, he was elected for a second time as Speaker of Parliament.

To this date in Turkish politics, 'Yıldırım Akbulut' has become synonymous with 'political puppet', denoting a politician stationed in high office but actually only serving on behalf of another, more powerful superior. When serving Prime Minister Recep Tayyip Erdoğan was elected President in 2014, the media ran speculation about who would be Erdoğan's 'Yıldırım Akbulut' (replacement prime minister on Erdoğan's behalf).

Biography
Akbulut was born in Erzincan, Turkey as the son of a postman. After finishing high school, he was educated in Law at  Istanbul University. Following his graduation, he worked as a freelance lawyer.

Upon entering the political arena, Akbulut was elected to the parliament from the Erzincan province. He served as Minister of Interior in the cabinet of Turgut Özal. He was then elected Speaker of the Parliament serving between December 24, 1987 and November 9, 1989.

After the election of Turgut Özal as the President of Turkey, Akbulut became Prime Minister from November 9, 1989 forming the 47th government of Turkey. On June 15, 1991 he lost Anavatan Party primaries to Mesut Yilmaz, ending his tenure in office. In 1992, with the order of Ozal, Akbulut resigned from the party, however, he returned shortly afterwards.

On May 20, 1999, Yıldırım Akbulut was elected for the second time Speaker of the Grand National Assembly that lasted until September 30, 2000.

He was married and had three children. Akbulut died at the age of 85 in Ankara on 14 April 2021. He was interred at the Turkish State Cemetery.

References

1935 births
2021 deaths
20th-century prime ministers of Turkey
People from Erzincan
Motherland Party (Turkey) politicians
Istanbul University alumni
Istanbul University Faculty of Law alumni
Deputies of Erzincan
Leaders of political parties in Turkey
Prime Ministers of Turkey
Grand Crosses of the Order of the Star of Romania
Speakers of the Parliament of Turkey
Ministers of the Interior of Turkey
Members of the 21st Parliament of Turkey
Members of the 45th government of Turkey
Members of the 47th government of Turkey
Burials at Turkish State Cemetery
Deputy Speakers of the Grand National Assembly of Turkey